The Chronology of the Wars of the Three Kingdoms lists major events that occurred during the Wars of the Three Kingdoms. The presentation of the data in a table format allows interested parties to copy and transfer the data to other software or databases with discrete data fields.

Scope of historical coverage

Included as components of the Wars of the Three Kingdoms are:
Bishops' Wars
The Irish Rebellion of 1641
The Irish Confederate Wars
The First English Civil War
The Second English Civil War
The 1650–1652 Anglo-Scottish war
Scotland's participation in the Wars of the Three Kingdoms 
The Cromwellian Conquest of Ireland
Glencairn's Rising in Scotland

Data fields included
Data fields include:
Event - This field includes a short commentary on individual battles, sieges, along with other significant events that provide context to the overall history.
Start Date - These fields provide the most commonly accepted date (month, day, and year) on which the event began or occurred.
End Date - These fields provide the most commonly accepted date (month, day, and year) on which the event ended.
Event Location - This field provides the location of the battles and sieges discussed as events.
Associated Wars - These fields provide the name(s) of the war(s) associated with the individual events.

Notes regarding the data fields

Dates
With respect to the dates provided for the individual events, portions of some dates have been estimated based upon imprecise historical dating (e.g. spring, summer, fall, winter, early in the month, the middle of the month, etc.). In these cases, the dates are shown in red font.

Many of the dates were taken from Wikipedia articles. As of publication of this article in September 2020, the dates of the events in the table are fully consistent with Wikipedia articles associated with the Wars of the Three Kingdoms.

Event locations
Some locations were the site of multiple events during the War of the Three Kingdoms. In those cases a numerical count is provided after the name of the location (e.g. Oxford 1st, Oxford 2nd, etc.). If a location was the site of a single event, no numerical count will be shown. A siege of a location is only counted once and will include appropriate notations (e.g. Siege Starts, Siege Continues, and Siege Ends).

Associated wars
In some cases, an event is associated with multiple wars. In those cases, two fields (Primary and Secondary) will be populated.

Database

Sources

	

17th century in England
17th century in Ireland
17th century in Scotland
Wars involving England
Wars involving Ireland
Wars involving Scotland